Battle of Pobiedziska was a battle fought in 1041, during the Miecław's Rebellion, between the Duchy of Poland led by Casimir I the Restorer and its ally, Kievan Rus' led by Yaroslav the Wise, against the forces of Miecław, the self-proclaimed leader of his state. The battle was fought near the settlement of Pobiedziska in the Greater Poland. It ended with a decisive Polish victory and destruction of Miecław's army and led to the signing of the truce between both sides, which lasted until 1047.

Before the battle 

Following the death of Mieszko II Lambert, king of Poland, in 1034, and the exile of his, Casimir I the Restorer, to Kingdom of Hungary, the state had fallen into a period of destabilization within the Duchy of Poland, that led to the start of the 1038 Peasant Uprising. Seizing the opportunity, around 1038, the cup-bearer Miecław had formed the state in Masovia, declaring its independence from Poland, and started his own royal dynasty.

Casimir I the Restorer, duke of Poland, had returned to the country from his exile in 1039. He had formed an alliance with Yaroslav the Wise, Grand Prince of Kiev, the leader of Kievan Rus', via the marriage of Maria Dobroniega with Casimir. Expecting the attack from Rus', Miecław had formed an alliance with Pomeranian and Yotvingian tribes.

Battle 
In the spring of 1041, Miecław had begun the campaign against Polish forces. His forces had fought with the army led by Casimir and Yaroslav, near the settlement of Pobiedziska. The battle ended with a decisive Polish victory and destruction of Miecław's army and led to the signing of the truce between both sides.

Citations

Notes

References

Bibliography 
 Ł. Piernikarczyk, Masław i jego państwo (1037–1047).
 Tadeusz Łepkowski, Słownik historii Polski. Warsaw. 1973, p. 363.
 Kazimierz Odnowiciel, Śląsk, 1979.
 A. Bielowski, Kronika śląsko-polska, in Monumenta Poloniae Historica, vol. 3, Warsaw, 1961.

Battles of the Middle Ages
Battles involving Poland
Battles involving Kievan Rus'
History of Masovia
History of Greater Poland
History of Poland during the Piast dynasty
Conflicts in 1041
11th century in Europe
11th century in Poland
Miecław's Rebellion